Abdul Malik is a given name.

Abdul Malik, Abdul Malek, Abdul Malik, Abdul Maleak or similar may also refer to:

Abd al Malik (rapper) (born 1975), Congolese-French rapper
Abd al-Malik al-Muzaffar (died 1008), general and vizier of the Caliphate of Cordoba, and governor of Seville and Saragossa
Abd al-Malik ibn Marwan (646–705), 5th Umayyad Caliph, ruling from Damascus
Abd al-Malik ibn Umar ibn Marwan (718–778), Umayyad elder statesman, general, and governor of Seville.
Abd al-Malik ibn Rabi, early narrator of hadith
Abd al-Malik ibn Salih (died 812), Abbasid prince and general
Abd al-Malik ibn Quraib Al-Asmaʿi (ca. 740–828), Iraqi scholar
Abd al-Malik I (Samanid emir) (died 961), emir of the Sāmānids (Persia)
Abd al-Malik II (Samanid emir) (fl. 999), emir of the Sāmānids (Persia)
Abdalmalik of Morocco (1696–1729), Sultan of Morocco
Abdelmalek Cherrad (born 1981), Algerian footballer
Abdelmalek Djeghbala (born 1983), Algerian footballer
Abdelmalek Droukdel (1970–2020), Algerian al-Qaeda leader
Abdelmalek Mokdad (born 1985), Algerian footballer
Abdelmalek Ziaya (born 1984), Algerian footballer
Abdolmalek Rigi (ca. 1983–2010), Iranian Sunni militant
Abdul Malek Ukil (1924–1987), Bangladeshi lawyer and politician
Abdul Malik, name used by Michael X (1933–1975), Trinidadian black revolutionary
Abdul Malik (physician), Bangladeshi professor and cardiologist
Abdul Malik Jaber, Palesinain businessman
Abdul Malik Mujahid (born 1951), Pakistani-American imam
Abdul Malik Mydin (born 1975), Malaysian swimmer
Abdul Malik Pahlawan, Afghan militia leader who led his forces for both the Taliban and Northern Alliance
Abdul-Malik al-Houthi, Yemeni rebel
Abdulmalik Dehamshe (born 1943), Arab-Israeli politician
Abdulmalik Mohammed, Kenyan suspected of hotel bombing, held in Guantanamo
Abu Manşūr 'Abd ul-Malik ibn Mahommed ibn Isma'īl, known as Tha'ālibī (961–1038), Persian-Arabic philologist and writer
Abu Marwan Abd al-Malik I Saadi (died 1578), Sultan of Saadi Dynasty in Morocco
Abu Marwan Abd al-Malik II (reigned 1627–1631), Sultan of Morocco
Abū Merwān ’Abdal-Malik ibn Zuhr (1091–1161), Muslim physician, pharmacist, surgeon, parasitologist and teacher in Al-Andalus
Abdelmalek Droukdel (born 1970), Algerian al-Qaeda leader
Ahmed Abdul-Malik (1927–1993), Sudanese-American jazz musician
Ahmed Eid Abdel Malek (born 1980), Egyptian footballer
Ali ibn Abd-al-Malik al-Hindi (1472–1567), Sunni Muslim scholar
Anwar Abdul Malik (1898–1998), Malaysian politician
Johari Abdul-Malik, American imam
Prince Malik of Brunei (born 1983)